Bryum urbanskyi is a species of moss belonging to the family Bryaceae.

It is native to Antarctica.

References

urbanskyi